Agapanthia subnigra is a species of beetle in the family Cerambycidae. It was described by Pic in 1890.

References

subnigra
Beetles described in 1890